Balam (Mayan for "jaguar") is an annual magazine and photobook based in Buenos Aires, Argentina that is mainly focused on Latin American contemporary photography, with special emphasis on queer artists and the particularities of their regional context. Originally established as an online magazine in 2015, it became a print publication from its fifth publication in early 2018 onwards. Balam has had seven issues, three of which were released in print form. The eight issue of the publication—which will revolve around the theme of "Chosen Families"—is set to be released in 2022.

Closer in style to publications from outside the continent, the magazine has been considered the only one of its kind in Argentina and, in general terms, Latin America as a whole. Each issue of Balam is centered on an unifying theme from which an open call is opened for photographers to submit their work. In 2022, Balam received the Shannon Michael Cane Award given to emerging artists and publishers by the NY Art Book Fair.

Background
Balam is both a photography magazine and a photobook that is published in Buenos Aires, Argentina. It was conceived in 2015 by Luis Juárez, a university student from Honduras who had emigrated to Buenos Aires in 2009, but was then living in Santiago, Chile. The creation of the project was a response to the art and photography scene of South America, characterized by limited cultural funding, "stuffy institutionalism", and the prevalence of "hetero-cis white content". Interviewed in 2021, Juárez stated that the magazine "arose in response to how photography is being fractured, unable to represent and make visible dissident and marginalised communities. (...) [I wanted to explore] realities that are outside the norm."

The term "balam"—meaning "jaguar" in the languages of the Maya peoples—is a reference to the long iconographic tradition of the animal in Mesoamerica, as well as a homage to Juárez' Honduran origin, who felt the name "refers to passion". The magazine has been considered the only project of its kind in Argentina and, broadly speaking, in Latin America as a whole, so it mainly takes publications from outside the continent as reference points. It is focused on the contemporary photography of Latin America, with special emphasis on queer realities and the peculiarities of their regional context. Balam also explores a variety of social issues that are specially prominent in the region, including racism, violence, immigration and marginalisation, among others. The magazine presents itself with the aim of "promoting new ways of showing photography from a Latin American point of view". Writing for AnOther magazine in 2021, Dominique Sisley noted that Balam "works on two levels. On the first, it spotlights the more serious issues faced by Latin America's LGBTQ+ community, highlighting its injustices and forgotten history. At the same time, it opens up the conversation, celebrating the more mundane, everyday experiences to encourage relatability and accessibility."

Publication history

Each release of Balam is built around a theme from which an open call for photographers is put out. The direction and content of each installment are built around these submissions. In its first four issues, Balam was published as an online magazine. The titles and unifying themes of each of these releases are: "Me encantaría sentir algo" (English: "I would love to feel something"; April 2015), "Piel" (English: "Skin"; August 2015), "Género" (English: "Gender"; December 2015) and "Extranjerismos" (English: "Foreignness"; December 2016). Between 2016 and 2017, Balam sought to consolidate itself as a project that existed outside of digital content, and began to seek funds to take the step towards print publication. This culminated in the awarding of the Mecenazgo program (i.e. patronage) of the Government of the City of Buenos Aires, which allowed the magazine to be printed from its fifth publication in early 2018 onwards.

Since then, the printed magazine has been presented and distributed in art galleries and independent bookstores in cities such as Buenos Aires, Santiago, London, New York City, Paris, Madrid, Barcelona, Valencia, and Melbourne. In order for Balam to have its own space for dissemination outside of bookstores or museums, the magazine's team also created the Feria Migra in 2018, an art book fair devoted to independent publications and printed art that is mainly held in Buenos Aires and has been carried out several times a year since then. In addition to the magazine, Balam also organizes workshops, talks and screening cycles, in addition to creating specific content for its online platform.

The first printed issue of the magazine (and the fifth overall) was published in 2018 and is centered on the theme of "Metamorfosis" (English: "Metamorphosis"). The choice of topic was inspired by the 1915 novella of the same name by Franz Kafka. The sixth issue of Balam was published two years later and revolves around the theme of "Mestizx", a "Latin term for mixed-racial heritage." The magazine explained the idea behind this theme: "We see individuals as mixed beings, mestizx in blood, skin, inspiration and gender. We would like to ask in what ways you see our generation as mestizx. This issue seeks to empower the concept of mestizx and all those working with it." According to Matt Alagiah of It's Nice That, the issue "challenges perceptions of established beauty and aims to spark conversations about patriarchal white heteronormativity." Among the works included, the "Mestizx" issue features photographs from Sunil Gupta's 1976 series "Christopher Street".

The seventh issue of Balam was published in 2021 and is organized under the topic of "Fantasía" (English: "Fantasy"). According to Juárez, the idea of "Fantasía" was born during the production of "Mestizx", as it "aroused a curiosity to know where fantasies arose from, what it is like to create 'forbidden' things, make our own worlds far from what is established and regulated." AnOthers Dominique Sisley described it as "loose theme that refers vaguely to any 'images, stories, events' that do not 'exist' in a patriarchal society. There are stories on dreams, eroticism, trans rights, and subversive beauty ideals." The issue is subdivided into five sections: "La isla" (English: "The Island"), "Jardines" (English: "Gardens"), "Bellxs" (English: "Beauties"), "Cócteles" (English: "Cocktails"), "Morfeo" (English: "Morpheus") and "Cárites" and (English: "Charities"). It includes photographs from Alejandro Kuropatwa's famous 1996 series "Cóctel", which criticized the antiretroviral pills of the HIV/AIDS crisis.

The open call for Balams eight issue—which will revolve around the theme of "Chosen Families"—began on June 1, 2022, and lasted until July 1, 2022.

Printed issues

See also

 List of art magazines
 List of LGBT periodicals
 List of magazines in Argentina
 List of online magazines

References

External links
 

2015 establishments in Argentina
Annual magazines
Books of photographs
Independent magazines
LGBT-related magazines
Magazines published in Buenos Aires
Magazines established in 2015
Photography magazines
Queer magazines
Zines
LGBT literature in Argentina